Isabel Kerschowski (born 22 January 1988) is a German football striker. She currently plays for 1. FFC Turbine Potsdam and for the German national team.

Kerschowski played for Germany at the 2008 FIFA U-20 Women's World Cup.

International career
She was part of the squad for the 2016 Summer Olympics, where Germany won the gold medal.

International goals
Scores and results list Germany's goal tally first:

Source:

Honours

1. FFC Turbine Potsdam
UEFA Women's Champions League: Winner 2009–10
Bundesliga: Winner 2005–06, 2008–09, 2009–10, 2010–11, 2011–12
DFB-Pokal: Winner 2005–06
DFB-Hallenpokal for women: 2008, 2009

VfL Wolfsburg
Bundesliga: Winner 2016-17
DFB-Pokal: Winner 2014–15, 2015–16, 2016–17

Germany
Summer Olympic Games: Gold medal, 2016
UEFA Women's Under-19 Championship: Winner 2006, 2007

Individual
UEFA Women's Under-19 Championship: Golden Player 2006

Private life 
In September 2017, she married her girlfriend.

References

External links 
 
 
 
 
 
 
 
 

1988 births
Living people
German women's footballers
Germany women's international footballers
1. FFC Turbine Potsdam players
Bayer 04 Leverkusen (women) players
VfL Wolfsburg (women) players
Footballers from Berlin
German twins
Twin sportspeople
Footballers at the 2016 Summer Olympics
Olympic gold medalists for Germany
Olympic medalists in football
Medalists at the 2016 Summer Olympics
Women's association football defenders
Women's association football forwards
Frauen-Bundesliga players
Olympic footballers of Germany
Lesbian sportswomen
German LGBT sportspeople
LGBT association football players
UEFA Women's Euro 2017 players